Charles Somerset, Marquess of Worcester (25 December 1660 – 13 July 1698) was an English nobleman and politician.

He was the eldest surviving son of Henry Somerset, 1st Duke of Beaufort and Mary Capell, and was styled Lord Herbert of Raglan from 1667 until 1682 and Marquess of Worcester thereafter. 
He attended Christ Church, Oxford University, matriculated in 1677 and was awarded an MA in 1682.

Career
He was elected the youngest ever (aged 12)  Fellow of the Royal Society in June 1673.

He was Commissioner for Assessment for Brecon from 1677 to 1679) and for Gloucestershire, Middlesex, Monmouth and Brecon from 1689 to 1690. In 1681 he travelled to the Netherlands.

He was appointed Colonel of Militia for Bristol (1682–1685) and was a Member of the Council of Wales and the Marches] (1682–1689) under his father as Lord President. He commanded the Glamorgan Militia in 1684 when his father inspected them. He was appointed Custos Rotulorum of Radnorshire (1682–1689) and Deputy Lieutenant of Monmouthshire (1683–1687), Wiltshire (1683–1688) and Gloucestershire (1685–1687).

He was a Member of the Committee of the Honourable East India Company (1683–1691). He was Colonel of a regiment of foot (1685–1687) and MP for Monmouthshire  (1685–1687 and 1689–1695).

Private life
On 6 June 1682, he married Rebecca Child, who was the daughter of Sir Josiah Child of Wanstead, 1st Baronet and aunt of Richard Child, 1st Earl Tylney. They had at least two children:
 Henry Somerset, 2nd Duke of Beaufort, his heir and his father's successor; and
 Lady Henrietta Somerset, who was born on 27 August 1690, died on 9 August 1726 and was married to Charles Fitzroy, 2nd Duke of Grafton on 30 April 1713, with whom she had four sons and three daughters.

After his death in a coach accident in 1698 he was buried in Raglan. Charles predeceased his father and, on the duke's death, the dukedom passed to Charles's son Henry. His widow remarried the Hon John Granville in 1703.

References

1660 births
1698 deaths
Alumni of Christ Church, Oxford
British courtesy marquesses
Devonshire Regiment officers
Gloucestershire Militia officers
Glamorgan Militia officers
Heirs apparent who never acceded
C
Fellows of the Royal Society
Deputy Lieutenants of Monmouthshire
Deputy Lieutenants of Wiltshire
Deputy Lieutenants of Gloucestershire
English MPs 1661–1679
English MPs 1679
English MPs 1680–1681
English MPs 1681
English MPs 1685–1687
English MPs 1689–1690
English MPs 1690–1695